Blank slate is the epistemological thesis that individual human beings are born with no built-in mental content.

Blank slate may also refer to:

 "Blank Slate" (The Outer Limits), a 1999 television episode
 The Blank Slate by Steven Pinker, a 2002 psychology book
 Blank Slate (manga), a 2005 manga written and illustrated by Aya Kanno
 Blank Slate, a 2008 thriller television film directed by John Harrison''
 Blank Slate Books, a UK-based publisher of comics and graphic novels

See also
 Tabula Rasa (disambiguation)
 Blank pad rule, legal doctrine and metaphor